The Bowling Green–Toledo football rivalry is annual college football rivalry game between Mid-American Conference members Bowling Green State University (BGSU) and the University of Toledo (UT). The universities are separated by about   along Interstate 75 (I-75). The Bowling Green Falcons and Toledo Rockets have exchanged two traveling trophies; the Peace Pipe Trophy (1980–2010), and the Battle of I-75 Trophy (2011–present). Toledo currently leads the series 42-41-4.

History

Traveling trophies

Peace Pipe Trophy
In 1980, a scale-down replica was fashioned and placed on top of a trophy created by former UT football player Frank Kralik. The Peace Pipe Trophy is a miniature replica of an American Indian sacred ceremonial pipe, sitting atop a trophy with both football teams' logos.  Kralik donated the trophy to the university to be given to the winner of each year's football game, which like many other college football rivalries is usually the last game of the regular season for both teams.  Though the two schools play in different divisions in the Mid-American Conference, they have yet to meet in the MAC Championship Game.

The awarding of the Peace Pipe Trophy was discontinued after the 2010 game. The schools agreed to change the trophy after conversations with members of the American Indian community. Taken into consideration was the spiritual symbolism of the ceremonial pipe to the American Indian community, as well as the NCAA's push to remove inappropriate American Indian nicknames and symbols associated with member's athletic teams. The Peace Pipe Trophy will be permanently housed in the Toledo football trophy case as the Rockets won the last battle for the Peace Pipe in 2010.

Battle of I-75 Trophy
Beginning in 2011, the two schools started playing for the Battle of I-75 Trophy. Sponsored by Taylor Kia Automotive Group, it replaced the Peace Pipe Trophy. The Battle of I-75 Trophy was designed by Jeff Artz, who also designed the Fred Biletnikoff Award (awarded to America's top college football wide receiver). Toledo leads 10–2.

Recent Toledo domination
Toledo won nine straight games from 2010 to 2018. The 2017 contest was, "a snoozer as they blew out the Falcons 66-37 before a crowd that barely dented the Doyt’s capacity. Coaches on both teams agreed, "the fiercest and most-heated rivalry in the Mid-American Conference has lost some luster, and that's probably because of the lopsidedness". In 2019, on the 100th anniversary of the rivalry, Toledo's streak ended as Bowling Green, a 26-point underdog, defeated the Rockets. The Falcons coached by first-year Head Coach Scot Loeffler dominated all game. Walk-on Grant Loy got his first career start at QB, rushing for 137 yards and a TD while throwing for another. The Falcons Defense led by Brandon Perce held the dominant Toledo offense to only 7 points as the Falcons won 20–7. Toledo resumed their winning ways in 2020 to continue to lead the overall series.

Notable games

2010: First primetime game
On November 17, 2010, Toledo and Bowling Green met for the first primetime game in series history. The game was held in Toledo and broadcast by ESPN2, Dave Neal and Andre Ware on the call. Toledo Rockets came into the game with a 6–4 record on the season. The Bowling Green Falcons came into the game at 2–8 on the season. The game was the last time they play for the Peace Pipe Trophy due to conversations with members of the American Indian community. Taken into consideration was the spiritual symbolism of the ceremonial pipe to the American Indian community, as well as the NCAA's push to remove inappropriate American Indian nicknames and symbols associated with member's athletic teams. Toledo defeated Bowling Green 33–14. The Rockets gained 537 yards and held the Falcons to 254 yards. Toledo forced five turnovers (three fumbles and two interceptions) in the game and gave up one interception. Toledo took a 26–7 lead at halftime. Then they only score fourteen points all together in the second half.

Game results

See also  
 List of NCAA college football rivalry games

References

College football rivalries in the United States
Bowling Green Falcons football
Toledo Rockets football
1919 establishments in Ohio